Gabriel Bogdan Țăruș (born 1 August 1975 in Piatra Neamț, Neamț) is a former Romanian athlete who competed in long jump. He has, success in World Championships. His personal best is 8.29 metres, achieved in 1996. He retired in the summer of 2006.

Competition record

External links 
 
 

1975 births
Living people
Olympic athletes of Romania
Athletes (track and field) at the 1996 Summer Olympics
Athletes (track and field) at the 2000 Summer Olympics
Athletes (track and field) at the 2004 Summer Olympics
Romanian male long jumpers
Sportspeople from Piatra Neamț
European Athletics Championships medalists